Endebess is a constituency in Kenya. It is one of five constituencies in Trans-Nzoia County. It was established/created for the 2013 general election, and it was carved out of the larger Kwanza constituency. Robert Pukose was elected as its inaugural member of parliament, and was re-elected for the subsequent terms in the 2017 Kenyan general election and the 2022 Kenyan general election .

Members of Parliament

County Assembly Wards

References

Constituencies in Trans-Nzoia County